Alain Terzian (born 2 May 1949) is a French-Armenian film producer, Administrator of Cannes Film Festival jury, and former President of Académie des Arts et Techniques du Cinéma. He is the chief executive officer of Alter Films and the President of Union of French Producers, UPF.

On 12 March 2009, among with Charles Aznavour, André Santini and Hélène Ségara he attended the opening ceremony of the Yerevan Park in the center of Paris.

Leadership of the Académie des Arts et Techniques du Cinéma
In 2003, he was elected President of Académie des Arts et Techniques du Cinéma, a position from which he resigned in 2020 when the collective resignation of the Academy's board of directors led to a profound restructuring of the institution.

Terzian was involved in a dispute in January 2020.  A dinner was held to announce the nominees for the 45th César Awards, inviting various actors and staff of nominated films.  Invitees were allowed to bring along another figure involved with the film industry with them.  Two attendees submitted requests, one for director Claire Denis and the other for writer Virginie Despentes; both are known as feminists.  The Academy's leadership rejected Denis and Despentes and refused to allow them at the ceremony. An open letter signed by over 400 figures in the French film industry criticized the "arbitrary, even discriminatory manner" in which these two attendees were rejected, with no reason given, and criticized Terzian directly over the matter as the one who was behind the decision.

Filmography

Awards
Officer of Légion d'honneur
Chevalier of Ordre d'honneur (Armenia) (2009)
Officer of Ordre national du Mérite
Chevalier of Ordre des Arts et des Lettres

References

External links

Terzian
France picks 'Persepolis' as Oscar entry
Tautou film tops Cesar prize nods
Yerevan Park in Paris

French film producers
Living people
1949 births
Film people from Paris
French people of Armenian descent
Officers of the Ordre national du Mérite